NNO may stand for:
 Nuveen North Carolina Dividend Advantage Municipal Fund 2 (stock symbol: NNO)
 Natural number object, in category theory, a subfield of mathematics
 National Night Out, a crime prevention activity in the United States
 Nynorsk, ISO 639-2 and ISO 639-3 language codes
 Nitrous oxide